Khaled Bousseliou (born 10 December 1997) is an Algerian professional footballer who plays for USM Alger in the Algerian Ligue Professionnelle 1.

Career
In 2022, Bouchouareb signed a two-year contract with USM Alger.

References

External links
 

1997 births
Living people
Algerian footballers
USM Alger players
Association football wingers